Steve Glodjinon (born 18 December 1993) is a Beninese international footballer who plays for JA Cotonou, as a goalkeeper.

References

1993 births
Living people
Beninese footballers
Benin international footballers
USS Kraké players
Energie FC players
JA Cotonou players
Association football goalkeepers